"Disco Nights (Rock-Freak)" is a song written by Emanuel LeBlanc, Herb Lane, Keith Crier and Paul Service and performed by American band GQ, from their 1979 debut studio album Disco Nights. The song was produced by Larkin Arnold, Beau Ray and Fleming Jimmy Simpson. The original title is "(Rock-Freaks) Disco / Boogie".

The single ranked No. 76 on the Billboard Year-End Hot 100 singles of 1979.

Charts
The single spent two weeks at number one on the soul chart during the spring of 1979, and was the first number-one soul hit for Arista Records, and peaked at No. 12 on the pop chart in April of that year. The single also peaked at No. 3 on the disco chart.

Weekly Charts

Year-end Charts

Sampling
Kon Kan sampled the song in their 1988 song "I Beg Your Pardon".

References

Songs about disco
1979 songs
1979 singles
GQ (band) songs
Arista Records singles